Sabun is a town in the southeastern Middle Shabelle (Shabeellaha Dhexe) region of Somalia.

References
Sabun

Populated places in Middle Shabelle